Carl Mellors (born 16 March 1965) is a South African cricketer. He played in one first-class and one List A match for Boland in 1988/89 and 1989/90.

See also
 List of Boland representative cricketers

References

External links
 

1965 births
Living people
South African cricketers
Boland cricketers
People from Bridlington